The Wellesley Nautical School was a naval training school first located on the Tyne, and later removed to Blyth

History
The Wellesley Nautical School was founded in 1868 by a group of philanthropic businessmen on Tyneside under the leadership of James Hall, 'to provide shelter for Tyneside waifs and train young men for service in both Royal and Merchant Navies.' The first accommodation was on board a Bombay built 74-gun third rate ship of the line HMS Cornwall, which had been launched as HMS Wellesley in 1815. This ship was repossessed and replaced circa 1874 by the hulked third rate, HMS Boscawen, moored on the Tyne at North Shields and also renamed T.S. Wellesley. By the early 1900s Wellesley was accepting boys from London, Manchester and Liverpool as well as from Tyneside and Yorkshire.

A change occurred in 1914 when the training ship was destroyed by fire, although all boys were brought ashore safely to reside until 1918 in the Tynemouth Plaza, on a temporary basis. An appeal was launched and raised £22,000 which allowed the school to take over the World War One submarine base at Blyth where it has been based since - apart from a period from the Second World War when the school evacuated to Hamsterley Forest in County Durham.

Wellesley became an approved school in 1933, but continued to train boys (some of whom were still there as abandoned children or voluntarily) for sea-going trades in a variety of vessels sailing out of Blyth. In 1973, following substantial changes in the treatment of young boys incorporated in the Children and Young Persons Act 1969, Wellesley became part of The City of Sunderland's Council's Social Services Department and although the nautical element continued into the 1970s the last thirty years of its operation saw a distinct move away from sea-going training towards more general education and training as "Wellesley Community Home".

After being refused planning permission by Blyth Valley Council to make improvements to the site, an appeal was made and won by Sunderland Council. However, after much consideration it was decided by Sunderland that the home would be closed; Wellesley officially closed its doors on 6 November 2006. A website and contact details can be found at www.tswellesley.com
There is also a Facebook page under The Wellesley Nautical School Old Boys Page

Notes
''This article contains text from the Wellesley Nautical School Home Site, by kind permission of the author

External links
School Index data from www.missing-ancestors.com

Royal Navy shore establishments
Defunct schools in Northumberland
Blyth, Northumberland
Educational institutions established in 1868
1868 establishments in England
Educational institutions disestablished in 2006
2006 disestablishments in England
Maritime colleges in the United Kingdom
Defunct prisons in England